In Christian liturgical worship, preces, also known in the Anglican prayer book tradition as the suffrages, are short petitions that are said or sung as versicles and responses by the officiant and congregation respectively. It is one of the oldest forms of prayer in Christianity, rooted in the pre-Christian Hebrew prayers of the Psalms used in  Temple worship.

In many prayer books, the versicles, to be spoken or sung by the priest, and the following responses, spoken or sung by the congregation, are denoted by special glyphs:

Versicle: ℣, a letter V crossed by an oblique line — Unicode , HTML entity  &#8483;
Response: ℟, a letter R crossed by an oblique line — Unicode , HTML entity  &#8479;

In Catholicism

Roman Rite
In the Roman Rite, the term preces is not applied in a specific sense to the versicles and responses of the different liturgical hours, on which those used in the Anglican services are based. In the Roman Rite Liturgy of the Hours, the word preces is freely used in the Latin text with its generic meaning of "prayers", but it has a specialized meaning in reference to the prayers said at Morning and Evening Prayer after the Benedictus or Magnificat and followed by the Lord's Prayer and the concluding prayer or collect.  They vary with the seasons (Advent, Christmastide, Lent, Eastertide, and Ordinary Time), being repeated generally only at four-week intervals, and with the celebration of saints. In the most widely used English translation of the Liturgy of the Hours, they are referred to as Intercessions, and are very similar to the General Intercessions found within the confines of the Mass.

An example is that of Morning Prayer on Thursday of Week 2 in Ordinary Time:
Versicle: Blessed be our God and Father: he hears the prayers of his children. 
Response: Lord, hear us.
Versicle: We thank you, Father for sending us your Son: - let us keep him before our eyes throughout this day. 
Response: Lord, hear us.
Versicle: Make wisdom our guide, - help us walk in newness of life.
Response: Lord, hear us.
Versicle: Lord, give us your strength in our weakness: - when we meet problems give us courage to face them.
Response: Lord, hear us.
Versicle: Direct our thought, our words, our actions today, - so that we may know, and do, your will.
Response: Lord, hear us.

Pre-1962 Roman Rite
In earlier iterations of the Roman Breviary before 1962, however, the preces proper referred to a series of versicles and responses which were said either standing or kneeling, depending on the day or season in which the prayers were to be uttered. There were two forms, the Dominical or abridged preces, and the Ferial or unabridged preces. These were said, as in the Anglican Communion, at both morning (Prime) and Evening (Vespers) Prayer. Here follows the Dominical preces from the common Prime office, from an edition of the pre-1962 Breviary online.

Versicle: Lord, have mercy upon us.
Response: Christ, have mercy upon us.  Lord have mercy upon us.
              Our Father. (Said aloud, and the rest silently until:)
Versicle: And lead us not into temptation.
Response: But deliver us from evil.
              I believe in God. (Said aloud, and the rest silently until:)
Versicle: The Resurrection of the body.
Response: And the Life † (Sign of the Cross) everlasting.  Amen.
Versicle: Unto thee have I cried, O Lord.
Response: And early shall my prayer come before thee.
Versicle: O let my mouth be filled with thy praise.
Response: That I may sing of thy glory and honour all the day long.
Versicle: O Lord, turn thy face from my sins.
Response: And put out all my misdeeds.
Versicle: Make me a clean heart, O God.
Response: And renew a right spirit within me.
Versicle: Cast me not away from thy presence.
Response: And take not thy Holy Spirit from me.
Versicle: O give me the comfort of thy help again.
Response: And stablish me with thy free Spirit.
Versicle: Our help † (Sign of the Cross) is in the Name of the Lord.
Response: Who hath made heaven and earth.

After which would follow the General Confession of sins.

This form of prayer has ceased to be used in the Roman Rite, aside from some of the more traditional groups.

The Mozarabic Rite
In the Mozarabic Rite the Preces or Preca are chants of penitential character used only in Lent. They are in the form of a litany, with a short response (usually miserere nobis - have mercy on us) to each invocation

The Opus Dei Preces
In the Catholic prelature of Opus Dei, the Preces are a special set of prayers said by each member every day.  It is also called "Prayers of the Work."

The prayer was originally composed by Josemaría Escrivá by December 1930. It was the first common activity of the members of Opus Dei in history. Escrivá composed the prayer by putting together phrases that he took from established liturgical prayers, and from the psalms in accordance with what he preached in The Way 86, about "using the psalms and prayers from the missal" for prayer. The prayers have undergone several changes through time.

The Preces, which is called "the universal prayer of the Work",  is described by one journalist as including "blessing of everyone from the Pope to Virgin Mary to the prelate of Opus Dei". John L. Allen describes its contents as follows: "invocations to the Holy Spirit, Jesus Christ, the Blessed Virgin Mary, Saint Joseph, the Guardian Angels, and Saint Josemaría, then prayers for the Holy Father, the bishop of the diocese, unity among all those working to spread the gospel, the prelate of Opus Dei and the other members of the Work, and invocations to Saints Michael, Gabriel, Raphael, Peter, Paul, and John (the Patrons of Opus Dei)".

I will serve! 
V. To the Most Blessed Trinity.	
R. Thank you, God, thank you: true and one Trinity, one and highest Deity, holy and one Unity. 
V. To Jesus Christ the King. 
R. The Lord is our Judge; the Lord is our Law-giver;  the Lord is our King: he himself will save us.	
V. Christ, Son of the living God, have mercy on us.	
R. Christ, Son of the living God, have mercy on us.	
V. Rise up, O Christ, help us. 
R. And set us free for your name's sake. 
V. The Lord is my light and salvation: whom shall I fear?
R. If armies surround me, my heart will not fear; if battle arises against me, in him will I hope.
V. To the Blessed Virgin Mary, Mediatrix.
R. Remember, O Virgin Mother of God, while you stand in the sight of the Lord, to speak well of us.
V. To Saint Joseph, Spouse of the Blessed Virgin Mary.
R. God made you as the Father of the King and lord of all his household: pray for us.
V. To the Guardian Angels.
R. Our Holy Guardian Angels, defend us in the battle, lest we perish in the terrible judgment.
V. To our founder Saint Josemaría.
R. Intercede for your children so that, being faithful to the spirit of Opus Dei, we may sanctify our work, and seek to win souls for Christ.
V. Let us pray for our Most Blessed Pope, N.
R. May the Lord preserve him, and give him life, and make him blessed on earth, and deliver him not into the hands of his enemies.
V. Let us also pray for the (Arch)bishop of this diocese.
R. May he stand and tend your flock in your strength, O Lord, in your sublime name.
V. Let us pray for the unity of the apostolate.
R. That all may be one, as you, Father, are in me, and I in you; that they may be one, as we are one.
V. Every kingdom divided against itself will be destroyed.
R. And every city or house divided against itself will not stand.
V. Let us pray for our benefactors.
R. Deign to grant, Lord, to all those doing good to us for your name's sake, life everlasting. Amen.
V. Let us pray for the Father [the current Prelate of Opus Dei].
R. May the mercy of the Lord be upon him from eternity to eternity: for the Lord guards all those who love him.
V. Let us pray for our brethren in Opus Dei, living and dead.
R. Save your servants, my God, that hope in you.
V. Send them, O Lord, help from your holy place.
R. And from Sion watch over them.
V. Grant them eternal rest, O Lord.
R  And let perpetual light shine upon them.
V. May they rest in peace. 
R. Amen.
V. Lord, hear my prayer.
R. And let my cry come to you.
[If a priest leads the Preces, he stands and adds 'The Lord be with you', and while remaining standing recites the prayer:]
V. The Lord be with you.
R. And with your spirit.
Let us pray. 
O God, whose property it is to have mercy always and to spare: hear our prayer. Enkindle our bodies and our hearts with the fire of the Holy Spirit, O Lord, that we may serve you with a chaste body and please you with a clean heart.
Direct, we beseech you, Lord, our actions by your inspirations, and further them by your assistance, so that every word and work of ours may begin always from you and by you be likewise ended.  Through Christ our Lord.
R. Amen.
[All say:]
May the all-powerful and merciful Lord grant us joy with peace, amendment of life, time for true penance, the grace and consolation of the Holy Spirit, and perseverance in Opus Dei.
V. Saint Michael.
R. Pray for us.
V. Saint Gabriel.		
R. Pray for us. 
V. Saint Raphael. 
R. Pray for us. 
V. Saint Peter. 
R. Pray for us. 
V. Saint Paul. 
R. Pray for us. 
V. Saint John. 
R. Pray for us. 
[If a priest is present, the leader says:]
Father, bless us.
[The priest gives the blessing:]
The Lord be in your hearts, and upon your lips, in the name of the Father, and the Son, and the Holy Spirit.
R. Amen.
V. Peace.
R. Forever.

In Anglicanism
An example familiar to Anglicans (and Lutherans, in their Matins services) is the opening versicles and responses of the Anglican services of Morning Prayer and Evening Prayer according to the Book of Common Prayer:

Priest: O Lord, open thou our lips:
People: And our mouth shall shew forth thy praise.
Priest: O God, make speed to save us:
People: O Lord, make haste to help us.
Priest: Glory be to the Father, and to the Son, and to the Holy Ghost (or Spirit).
People: As it was in the beginning, is now, and ever shall be, world without end. Amen. 
Priest: Praise ye the Lord. 
People: The Lord's name be praised.

This particular form has existed in all of the liturgical churches since well before the Reformation. The responses continue later in the service, after the Apostles' Creed.

There are many musical settings of the text, ranging from largely homophonic settings such as those by William Byrd and Thomas Morley, to more elaborate arrangements that may even require organ accompaniment. Other choral settings of the responses for BCP Evensong include those by Thomas Tomkins, William Smith, Richard Ayleward, Bernard Rose, and Humphrey Clucas.

References

Liturgy of the Hours
Opus Dei
Roman Catholic prayers